Erica jasminiflora, the jasmine heath, is an endangered species of Erica, native to South Africa.

It is a small shrub around 60 cm high, consisting of thin, spindly branches ending in inflorescences consisting of three or four tubular shaped flowers. The star shaped corolla look similar to jasmine and are sticky. The colour of the corolla ranges from white to pale pink with darker pink veins. The leaves of the jasmine heath are reduced and flat against the thin branches.

The main pollinators are flies in the families Tabanidae and Nemestrinidae. Other insects that damage the flower and steal the nectar are deterred by a sticky layer on the outside of the flower. It flowers from November to March. It grows on iron-rich soils on underlying shale derived clay, and recovers effectively from wildfires. Unfortunately, agricultural practices are the major threat to populations of jasmine heath, already having reduced the number of plants to around 100 in a small area in the Swartberg.

References
Erica jasminiflora by Anthony Hitchcock, Kirstenbosch National Botanical Garden, February 2003

jasminiflora